The Lakes Open was a golf tournament played at The Lakes Golf Club in Sydney, New South Wales, Australia between 1934 and 1974. The inaugural event was organised in connection with the visit of a group of American professionals who had earlier played in the Lakes International Cup.

It was held annually until World War II with Jim Ferrier and Norman Von Nida both winning twice. It did not restart until 1947 and was held annually until 1967, except for 1965. The event was revived in 1974 as the Coca-Cola Lakes Open. Ferrier won for the third time in 1948, a feat later matched by Eric Cremin, Kel Nagle and Frank Phillips.

Winners

In 1939 there was an 18-hole playoff a week later. Von Nida scored to 74 to Bulger's 75. In 1974 Shearer won with a birdie at the first extra hole.

References 

Golf tournaments in Australia
Golf in New South Wales
Former PGA Tour of Australasia events
Sport in Sydney